RhoC (Ras homolog gene family, member C) is a small (~21 kDa) signaling G protein (more specifically a GTPase), and is a member of the Rac subfamily of the family Rho family of GTPases. It is encoded by the gene RHOC.

Mechanism and function
It is prenylated at its C-terminus, and localizes to the cytoplasm and plasma membrane. It is thought to be important in cell locomotion. It cycles between inactive GDP-bound and active GTP-bound states and function as molecular switches in signal transduction cascades. 
Rho proteins promote reorganization of the actin cytoskeleton and regulate cell shape and motility. RhoC can activate formins such as mDia1 and FMNL2 to remodel the cytoskeleton.

Overexpression of RhoC is associated with cell proliferation and causing tumors to become malignant. It causes degradation and reconstruction of the Extracellular Matrix (ECM) which helps cells escape the tissue they are currently in. It enhances cell motility giving it the ability to become invasive. It has been found to have a direct relationship to advanced tumor stage and metastasis, with increases in stage being related to increases in RhoC expression. RhoC-deficient mice can still develop tumors but these fail to metastasize, arguing that RhoC is essential for metastasis.
It has also been found to enhance the creation of angiogenic factors such as VEGF, which is necessary for a tumor to become malignant. 
In a study by Vega, RhoC was knocked out which resulted in cells spreading out wide in all directions. When RhoC was disabled, the cell's abilities to move in a specific direction and migrate was impaired. It also reduced the cell's speed of movement, because it was difficult, and sometimes impossible, to polarize the cell.

Associated Signaling Pathways 

RhoC expression has been associated with several signaling pathways and effectors. Here is a list of the ones found so far:
 IQGAP1 (IQ-domain GTP-ase Activating Protein): an effector of RhoC to enhance expression of cyclin E and cyclin D1. This resulted in cells being promoted to enter S phase more rapidly 
 ROCK-1  
 MMP9: necessary for ECM regulation 
 FMNL3: a Formin downstream target, which is used to regulate where Rac1 is active  
 MAPK pathway: upregulating VEGF, Basic fibroblastic growth factors, and interleukins 6 and 8 expression 
 Notch1  
 PI3K/AKt pathway: Proliferation and invasiveness  
 Pyk2: metastasis

Types of Cancer RhoC has been studied in 

RhoC has been found to be overexpressed in:
 Lung Cancer  
 Gastric Cancer  
 Ovarian cancer   
 Breast Cancer 
 Hepatocellular Cancer 
 Pancreatic Cancer  
 Colorectal Cancer 
 Cancer of the Urogenital System  
 Melanoma  
 Prostate Cancer 
 Cervical Carcinoma

Potential Therapies 

RhoC small interfering RNA (siRNA) have been used in studies to successfully inhibit proliferation of some invasive cancers  
RhoC can be used as a biomarker for judging the metastatic potential of tumors
One study used "recombinant adenovirus mediated RhoC shRNA in tandem linked expression" to successfully inhibit RhoC  
It has been found that RhoC expression is not important for embryogenesis but it is only important for metastasis, which would make it a good target for treatments.
A RhoC targeted therapy (RV001 by RhoVac) is currently tested in prostate cancer in an ongoing clinical phase 2b program in the US and Europe. Results are expected mid 2022 (Reference: https://clinicaltrials.gov/ct2/show/NCT04114825)

References

Further reading

External links